The historic centre of Puebla (Spanish: centro histórico de Puebla) was declared a World Heritage Site by UNESCO in 1987.

The Historic Monuments Zone of Puebla is considered the origin of Puebla. This Zone was decreed a Historic Monuments Zone in 1977 by presidential decree and 1 year later UNESCO declared it a World Heritage Site. The Historic Monuments Zone retains a lot of colonial buildings. Several of the oldest buildings were badly damaged in 1999 after the earthquake and later were subsequently repaired. Unfortunately, after the 2017 earthquake, some of them again suffered damage.

Features
 Barrio de los Sapos
 Barrio del Artista
 Biblioteca Palafoxiana
 Casa de la Cultura
 Chapel of the Rosario
 Church of La Compañía
 Church of las Capuchinas
 Church of San Cristóbal
 Church of San Juan de Dios
 Church of San Pedro
 Church of Santo Domingo
 El Parián
 Hospital Church of San Roque
 Maqueta del Centro de Puebla
 Municipal Hall of Puebla
 Parish of Santa Clara
 Puebla Cathedral
 Ángeles testigos de la Beatificación de Juan de Palafox y Mendoza
 Teatro Principal de Puebla
 Bust of Plácido Domingo
 Statue of Héctor Azar

See also
 Historic center of Mexico City
 List of World Heritage Sites in Mexico

References